Coccymys is a genus of rodent in the family Muridae endemic to Indonesia and Papua New Guinea.
It contains the following species:

 Coccymys kirrhos
 Rümmler's brush mouse (Coccymys ruemmleri)
 Coccymys shawmayeri

The genus previously included the White-toothed brush mouse (Brassomys albidens).

References

 
Rodent genera
Taxonomy articles created by Polbot